Jagoti is a Gram panchayat in Mahidpur tehsil in Ujjain district in the Indian state of Madhya Pradesh.

Geography

Villages of Ujjain district